RV: Resurrected Victims is a 2017 South Korean mystery thriller film directed by Kwak Kyung-taek. It is based on Park Ha-ik's 2012 novel It is Over. The film stars Kim Rae-won and Kim Hae-sook.

Plot
Jin-hong is a prosecutor who is bent on tracking down the culprit who killed his mother 7 years ago. One day, Jin-hong's deceased mother comes to life again and appears before him, however she is set on attacking him. At the same time,  unexplainable cases called RVP (Resurrected Victims Phenomenon) are reported throughout the world where victims of unsolved murders return to life to punish their killers. Based on this, secret agents investigating the cases conclude Jin-hong is the prime suspect of his mother's murder.

Cast
Kim Rae-won as Seo Jin-hong 
Kim Hae-sook as Choi Myung-sook 
Sung Dong-il as Son Young-tae 
Jang Young-nam as Seo Hee-jung 
Jeon Hye-jin as Lee Soo-hyun
Lee Ji-won as Myeong Eun-ji
Baek Bong-ki as Min-wook
Jang Myeong-gap as Executive of police
Gwak In-jun as General manager 
Hyun Bong-sik as Myeong Hyeon-cheol
Jung Se-hyung

References

External links

 

2017 films
South Korean mystery thriller films
2010s mystery thriller films
Films based on Korean novels
Showbox films
2010s South Korean films